Ellery is a surname, and may refer to:

People:

 Christopher Ellery (1768–1840), American politician, Senator from Rhode Island
 David Ellery, British author and ship historian
 John Ellery, British radio presenter and programme director
 Jason Haigh-Ellery, British television director
 Louise Ellery (born 1977), Australian athlete
 Paul Ellery, British radio presenter
 Reginald Spencer Ellery (1897–1955), a pioneer in the practice of psychiatry in Melbourne, Australia
 Robert L. J. Ellery (1827–1906), Government Astronomer of Victoria, Australia
 William Ellery (1720–1820), a signer of the United States Declaration of Independence and Continental Congressman from Rhode Island
Steven Ellery, Australian V8 Supercar racecar driver
David Peter Ellery QSM (22/12/1927-22/12/2006) New Zealand

See also
 Elleray, surname
 Ellory, surname

References

Cornish-language surnames